The Clipper 23, also called the Clipper Marine 23, is an American trailerable sailboat that was designed by William Crealock and first built in 1976.

Production
The design was initially built by Clipper Marine of Santa Ana, California, United States, starting in 1976. After that company went out of business in 1976 a twin-keel version was built by Sawyer Marine in Canada starting in 1984, but it is now out of production.

Design
The Clipper 23 is a recreational keelboat, built predominantly of fiberglass, with wood trim. It has a masthead sloop rig, a clipper bow, a reverse transom, a transom-hung,  non-folding rudder controlled by a tiller and a retractable swing keel or twin keels. It displaces  and carries  of cast iron ballast.

The boat is normally fitted with a small  outboard motor for docking and maneuvering, mounted in an aft starboard well.

The boat was offered with a choice of two interior layouts, one with two straight settees and one with a dinette table. The latter design has sleeping accommodation for five people, with a double "V"-berth in the bow cabin, a straight settee berth that can be converted to a double with a drop table on the port side and a quarter berth on the starboard side of the main cabin. The head is located in the bow cabin on the port side. A cabin "pop-top" was optional.

Operational history
In a 2010 review Steve Henkel wrote, "the Clipper 23, a boat with flare at the bow that gives it a
pinched look ... Best features: These boats were constructed cheaply to sell cheaply, for those who wanted a plaything but didn't want to invest much. Today their price on the used market continues to be near the bottom of the range for this size and type of vessel. Worst features: If the brochure plans are accurate, the rudder, which is deeper than the keel and apparently has no retracting device when in shallow water, may be damaged if the boat goes aground."

See also
List of sailing boat types

Related development
Clipper 21

References

External links
Photo of a Clipper 23 sailing
Photo of a Clipper 23 with pop top
Photo of a Clipper 23 twin keels
Photo of a Clipper 23 showing bow

Keelboats
1970s sailboat type designs
Sailing yachts
Trailer sailers
Boats designed by W. I. B. Crealock
Sailboat types built by Clipper Marine
Sailboat types built by Sawyer Marine